Louis Neal (born January 10, 1951) is a former American football wide receiver. He played for the Atlanta Falcons from 1973 to 1974 and for the San Antonio Wings in 1975.

References

1951 births
Living people
American football wide receivers
Prairie View A&M Panthers football players
Atlanta Falcons players
San Antonio Wings players